Colquhoun Railway Station was opened on Monday 10 April 1916 as part of the Orbost railway line. The station has long since closed, with the last train passing the site in 1987. 

Little evidence remains of the former station site, however the site remains as part of the East Gippsland Rail Trail, which follows the route of the former rail line. 

To the east of the former station site, about 4.5 km west of Nowa Nowa is the spectacular Stony Creek Trestle Bridge, built in the early 1900s and measuring 276m long and 19m high. While the bridge remains largely intact, including rails, for safety reasons due to its poor condition the bridge itself is fenced off, and the rail trail deviates down and across the Stony Creek valley beside the bridge. A carpark, toilet and picnic facilities are available at this location.

Gallery

References

External links
 Colquhoun Vicsig]

Disused railway stations in Victoria (Australia)
Transport in Gippsland (region)
Shire of East Gippsland